The two teams in this group played against each other on a home-and-away basis. The winner qualified for the seventh FIFA World Cup held in Chile.

Standings

Matches

References

External links
FIFA official page
RSSSF - 1962 World Cup Qualification
Allworldcup

1962 FIFA World Cup qualification (UEFA)
1960–61 in Spanish football
1961–62 in Spanish football
1960–61 in Welsh football
1961–62 in Welsh football